The Douglas-Hart Nature Center, located in Mattoon, Illinois, is a nature reserve that offers visitors different Illinois habitats, field programs, environmental educational classes, and volunteer opportunities for all ages.

In the 1960s Helen Douglas-Hart made her dream, a 33-acre nature preserve in Coles County, Illinois, a reality. Today, DHNC provides protection for three of Illinois primary habitats: tall grass prairie, native forest woodlands, and wetlands, on approximately 70 acres. There are two miles of trails that pass through each local habitat.

Illinois Habitats
Conservation of the three environmental biotopes native to Illinois is the primary directive of Douglas-Hart Nature Center. The biological communities that compose Illinois tall grass prairies, native forest woodlands, and wetlands are area specific, including plant and animal inhabitants, soil and growth characteristics.

Tall Grass Prairies
The native tall grass prairies under protection of DHNC are the most important habitat on the conservancy site. Before widespread settling in Illinois, prairie habitat covered 2/3 of the state. Now, prairie grass covers less than 1% of Illinois. Given the rampant destruction of this endangered habitat, both plants and animals that require the conditions of this biotope have decreased exponentially. Some populations of grassland birds, over the last century, have declined by 95%. Figures such as these reiterate the important role conservancies such as DHNC play in maintaining Illinois habitats.

Wetlands
The aquatic habitats found at DHNC consist of natural wetlands. In many cases, wetlands, as we have come to know them, are modified or completely artificial. The wetlands on the conservancy site are made up of the following types:
 Forested Wetland,
 Sedge Meadow,
 Surface Pond, and
 Marshland.

Each of these aquatic environments supports various waterfowl, migratory birds, and provides breeding grounds for native species of reptiles and amphibians.  These varied wetlands comprise 12 of the 70 acres at DHNC and are equipped with an observation or “lookout” area. However, the wetlands on the conservancy site are in danger. Like many of the natural wetland areas in Illinois, climatic shift is negatively impacting this natural biotope.

Native Forest Woodlands
Native deciduous and coniferous trees comprise the majority of the woodlands at DHNC. According to a survey of the area conducted by The University of Illinois, native trees were present at the site in a 2:1 ratio.  Also, the site boosts over 60 species of trees, many native to the state of Illinois. Many of the trees native to the area are labeled for ease of identification by visitors.  It is important to note that, even though this biotope is perhaps the best preserved of the three habitats at DHNC, woodlands in Illinois require just as much conservation as the others. Only 12% of the land area in Illinois remains forested compared to 40% before European settling. This represents a nearly 75% decrease in forested area in the state of Illinois alone. Thus, the native forest woodlands are requiring just as much care as the other habitats.

Douglas-Hart Nature Center's Plant Registry
The following list of live plants and trees at Douglas-Hart Nature Center, in Mattoon, Illinois, is supplied by specialists currently working at the conservancy site.

Visitor’s Center

The visitor’s facilities at Douglas-Hart Nature Center features interactive displays of local wild life, live reptiles and amphibians, a bird observation area, children's discovery den, library, classrooms and a gift shop. Programs are offered for families, children, school groups, scout groups and more.

Hiking & Outdoor Recreation
Douglas-Hart Nature Center offers two miles of easily accessible, mapped trails to those interested in viewing the conservation site’s habitats. There are five different trails on the property that tender distinct wildlife and biotope observations. There is also a picnic area.

Publications
Douglas-Hart Nature Center produces its own quarterly news-letter titled, NutHatch News. The goal of the conservancy’s publication is "to bring useful information to the community about DHNC, its programs, services, and staff, as well as helpful and interesting articles about nature and the environment".

References

Works Cited
"Illinois Forest Facts." Illinois Forestry. University of Illinois Extension Office, n.d. Web. 19 Sep 2011. <http://web.extension.illinois.edu/forestry/il_forest_facts.html>.
Wang, Jing-Shu, Saeed A. Khan, and Jeffrey O. Dawson. "NITROGEN FIXING TREES INFLUENCE CONCENTRATIONS OF AMMONIUM." AFTA 2005 Conference Proceedings. (2005): 1-17. Web. 19 Sep. 2011. <https://web.archive.org/web/20120402161743/http://www.cinram.umn.edu/afta2005/pdf/Dawson.PDF>.

External links
 Douglas-Hart Nature Center - official site

Nature reserves in Illinois
Nature centers in Illinois
Protected areas of Coles County, Illinois
Education in Coles County, Illinois
1960s establishments in Illinois
Protected areas established in the 1960s